The 2016–17 Syracuse Orange men's basketball team represented Syracuse University during the 2016–17 NCAA Division I men's basketball season. The Orange were led by 41st-year head coach Jim Boeheim and played their home games at the Carrier Dome in Syracuse, New York. They were fourth-year members of the Atlantic Coast Conference (ACC). They finished the season 19–15, 10–8 in ACC play to finish in a three-way tie for seventh place. They lost in the second round of the ACC tournament to Miami (FL). They were one of the last four teams not selected for the NCAA tournament and thus received a No. 1 seed in the National Invitation Tournament where they defeated UNC Greensboro in the first round to advance to the second round where they lost to Ole Miss.

Previous season
The Orange finished the 2015–16 season 23–14, 9–9 in ACC play to finish in a tie for ninth place. They lost to Pittsburgh in the second round of the ACC tournament. They received an at-large bid to the NCAA tournament as a No. 10 seed where they defeated Dayton, Middle Tennessee, Gonzaga, and Virginia to reach the Final Four for the sixth time in school history. At the Final Four, the Orange lost to North Carolina.

Departures

Recruits

Incoming Transfers

Future recruits

2017–18 team recruits

Roster

Schedule and results

|-
!colspan=12 style=| Exhibition

|-
!colspan=12 style=| Non-conference regular season

|-
!colspan=12 style=| ACC regular season

|-
!colspan=12 style=| ACC Tournament

|-
!colspan=12 style=| NIT

Rankings

*AP does not release post-NCAA Tournament rankings

References

Syracuse Orange men's basketball seasons
Syracuse
Syracuse
Syracuse Orange men's b
Syracuse Orange men's b